The 1937 Soviet football championship was the 7th seasons of competitive football in the Soviet Union. FC Dynamo Moscow won the championship becoming the winner of Group A for the second time. 

CDKA Moscow once again avoided relegation since the format for the next 1938 season changed again.

The defending champions Spartak, while defeating their main rivals Dinamo (2–1, 0–0) this season, had a poor start in the first half losing to Metallurg and Dinamo Kiev and let Dinamo Moscow outperform them.

Honours

Notes = Number in parentheses is the times that club has won that honour. * indicates new record for competition

Soviet Cup

Dinamo Moscow beat Dinamo Tbilisi 5–2 in the Soviet Cup final. Hat-trick was made by Mikhail Semichastny, while two goals for Georgians were scored by Berdzenishvili brothers.

Soviet Union football championship

Group A

Group B

Group V

Group G

Group D

Cities of the East

Top goalscorers

Group A
Vasily Smirnov (Dinamo Moscow) – 8 goals

Group B
Viktor Smagin (Stalinets Leningrad) – 7 goals

Republican level
Football competitions of union republics

Football championships
 Azerbaijan SSR – Lokomotiv Baku
 Armenian SSR – Spartak Yerevan
 Belarusian SSR – Dinamo Minsk (see Football Championship of the Belarusian SSR)
 Georgian SSR – Lokomotiv Tbilisi (reserves)
 Kazakh SSR – Dinamo Alma-Ata
 Kirgiz SSR – Dinamo Frunze
 Russian SFSR – none
 Tajik SSR – Dinamo Stalinabad
 Turkmen SSR – none
 Uzbek SSR – Spartak Tashkent
 Ukrainian SSR – Spartak Dnipropetrovsk (see 1937 Football Championship of the Ukrainian SSR)

Football cups
 Azerbaijan SSR – Temp Baku
 Armenian SSR – none
 Belarusian SSR – none
 Georgian SSR – none
 Kazakh SSR – Dinamo Karaganda
 Kirgiz SSR – Dinamo Frunze
 Russian SFSR – none
 Tajik SSR – none
 Turkmen SSR – DKA Ashkhabad
 Uzbek SSR – none
 Ukrainian SSR – Dynamo Kyiv (see 1937 Cup of the Ukrainian SSR)

References

External links
 1937 Soviet football championship. RSSSF